Bōken Korobokkuru  (also known as Adventures Of Korobokkle, Korobockle Adventures and The Mountain Gnomes) is a kodomo anime series.

It was an adaption of the children's book Stories of Korobokkle by Satoru Sato, which was itself based on some northern Japan's folktales from Ainu people. It consisted of 26 episodes and was originally broadcast on Yomiuri TV.

According to Jonathan Clements and Helen McCarthy's The Anime Encyclopedia, it was "a foreshadowing of later Studio Ghibli efforts like Pompoko and My Neighbor Totoro."

Cast
 
 Kei Tomiyama as Eji Sonta 
 Noriko Ohara as Love Love
 Shinpei Sakamoto as Cous-Cous
 Satoshi Hasegawa as Seitaka (Ichiro Minegawa)
 Yasushi Suzuki as Bokkuru

References

External links
 

1973 anime television series debuts
Tatsunoko Production
Topcraft
Yomiuri Telecasting Corporation original programming
Fictional gnomes
Films about gnomes
1974 Japanese television series endings